M. K. Gandhi is a bronze statue of Mahatma Gandhi in Gandhi Square, Johannesburg, which depicts the Indian independence campaigner and nonviolent pacifist as a young man.

Description and history
Prior to the statue's unveiling the square had been named Government Square. It was unveiled by the Mayor of Johannesburg, Amos Masondo, on October 2, 2003, Gandhi's birthday. 

The square had previously been known as Government Square and was the location of the Johannesburg Law Courts where Gandhi practiced law. The main Johannesburg bus terminus now stands where the law courts were located..

Tinka Christopher was chosen as the statue's sculptor by the advisory committee of the Johannesburg Art Gallery. The piece took Christopher three months to complete, with Christopher saying that she worked "...worked 10 hours each day, seven days a week, to complete the work in time". The other shortlisted artists were Naomi Jacobson, Ben Omar, and Maureen Quin. 

The statue is situated on a 5 meter high plinth, and benches surround the base of the statue.
The statue depicts Gandhi as he may have appeared in his time in Johannesburg, as a young man wearing his legal gown over his suit, with his cloak blown by the breeze. Gandhi holds a book and is looking forward. The statue contains an alarm monitored by a security company that detects vibrations arriving from theft.

The statue was half funded by the city of Johannesburg, with the remainder coming from private donations.

See also
 List of artistic depictions of Mahatma Gandhi

References

2003 establishments in South Africa
2003 sculptures
Buildings and structures in Johannesburg
Outdoor sculptures in South Africa
Sculptures of men in South Africa
Statues in South Africa
Johannesburg
Public art in Johannesburg
Books in art